The Winged Horseman is a lost 1929 American silent Western film directed by B. Reeves Eason and Arthur Rosson and starring Hoot Gibson and aviatrix Ruth Elder. It was produced and released by Universal Pictures.

A stunt woman, Leta Belle Wichart, died when her parachute failed to open during a scene standing in for Ruth Elder.

Cast
 Hoot Gibson as Skyball Smith
 Ruth Elder as Joby Hobson
 Charles Schaeffer as Colonel Hobson
 Allan Forrest as Curly Davis
 Herbert Prior as Eben Matthews

References

External links
 
 

1929 films
Lost Western (genre) films
Films directed by B. Reeves Eason
Films directed by Arthur Rosson
Universal Pictures films
1929 Western (genre) films
Lost American films
American black-and-white films
1929 lost films
Silent American Western (genre) films
1920s American films
1920s English-language films